Franzisca Hauke (born 10 September 1989) is a German field hockey player. She represented her country at the 2016 Summer Olympics and the 2020 Summer Olympics. Her brother, Tobias Hauke plays also field hockey for the German national team.

Education
Hauke completed her abitur in 2009 at the Gelehrtenschule des Johanneums.

References

External links
 
 
 

1989 births
Living people
German female field hockey players
Field hockey players at the 2016 Summer Olympics
Field hockey players at the 2020 Summer Olympics
Olympic field hockey players of Germany
Field hockey players from Hamburg
Olympic bronze medalists for Germany
Olympic medalists in field hockey
Medalists at the 2016 Summer Olympics
Female field hockey midfielders
People educated at the Gelehrtenschule des Johanneums
21st-century German women

2018 FIH Indoor Hockey World Cup players